The Biggest Winner Arab: Couples is the fourth season of the Arabic version of the reality television series The Biggest Loser. The fourth season premiered on September 26, 2009. This season started with eight couples (16 contestants) from six Arab countries and, unlike all past seasons, instead of the competition between Red and Blue Team the couples have competed against each other.

Contestants

Winners
 250,000 SAR. Winner (among the finalists)
 50,000 SAR. Winner (among the eliminated contestants)
 Second place has prize 30 SAR.
 Third place has 20 SAR.

Weigh-ins and eliminations

Game
 Week's Biggest Winner
 Gain weight
 Results from Eliminated Players Weigh in (Week 7)
 did not attend
Winners
 250,000 SAR Winner (among the finalists)
 50,000 SAR Winner (among the eliminated contestants)
BMI
 Normal (18.5 - 24.9 BMI)
 Overweight (25 - 29.9 BMI)
 Obese Class I (30 - 34.9 BMI)
 Obese Class II (35 - 39.9 BMI)
 Obese Class III (greater than 40 BMI)

Notes
 All contestant weights are in kilograms
 All contestant heights are in centimetres

Weight Loss History

Voting History

 Below yellow line, unable to vote
 Immunity
 Not in elimination, unable to vote
 Vote not revealed
 Immunity and Vote not revealed

References 

Lebanese television series
2009 Lebanese television seasons
2000s Lebanese television series